Roman Romanchuk (born 19 August 1986) is a professional Ukrainian football midfielder.

References

External links
 

1986 births
Living people
People from Kovel
Ukrainian footballers
Ukrainian expatriate footballers
FK Žalgiris players
Association football midfielders
Sportspeople from Volyn Oblast